Joyce's, formerly Joyces 365, was a supermarket chain based in Headford, Galway, Ireland.

Locations
The chain had nine stores, with five located in Galway towns (Headford, Oranmore, Tuam, Inverin and Athenry), as well four stores Galway city areas of Knocknacarra, Doughiska, Ballybane and Claddagh.

History
Joyces 365 was founded in 1951 and had around 230 employees. Pat Joyce is the owner and manager of the supermarket chain.

During the late 1970s saw two new developments with "Joyce & Sons Headford Ltd" as a Hardware and "Kevin Joyce" as a Drapery by brother of Patrick Joyce (senior), in 1978.

In 1982 a second Supermarket opened at the site Walsh's Bakery in Headford.

In 1991 the two were made bigger by buying Monaghan's Stationery Shop nearby for Filling Station in 1992.

On the 10 May 1999, Joyce's opened a new shop in Knocknacarra and in 2005 open a third store in Athenry. In June 2008, Joyce's became the supply chain of Nisa in Ireland.

In November 2010 Joyce's announced that they would be opening a supermarket in the Tuam shopping centre.

In July 2014, Joyces took over a SuperValu Store in Inverin, "Siopa an Phobail", that had been in receivership for more than two years.

In 2017, Joyce's took over the Galway-based Nestor's Supermarket Group, which had been franchised as SuperValu stores (Centra, in the case of the Doughiska branch), and rebranded all of its stores under its own name.

On November 30, 2021, Tesco announced that they had purchased all Joyce's stores for an undisclosed amount, and stores began to be rebranded as Tesco in 2022. As of 2023, the Oranmore store remains open as this store was not sold as part of the acquisition, due to a Tesco store already present.

References

External links
 Official website

Retail companies established in 1951
Supermarkets of the Republic of Ireland
Irish companies established in 1951